Mimeresia debora, the Debora's harlequin, is a butterfly in the family Lycaenidae. It is found in Sierra Leone, Ivory Coast, Ghana, Nigeria, Cameroon, Gabon, the Republic of the Congo, the Central African Republic, the Democratic Republic of the Congo and Uganda. Its habitat consists of forests.

Subspecies
 Mimeresia debora debora (Nigeria: Cross River loop, Cameroon, Gabon, Congo, Central African Republic, Democratic Republic of Congo: Sankuru)
 Mimeresia debora barnsi (Hawker-Smith, 1933) (Democratic Republic of the Congo: Uele, western Uganda)
 Mimeresia debora catori (Bethune-Baker, 1904) (Sierra Leone, Ivory Coast, Ghana, southern Nigeria)
 Mimeresia debora deborula (Aurivillius, 1899) (Congo-Brazzaville: Kouilou)

References

Butterflies described in 1890
Poritiinae
Butterflies of Africa